Ramón Jufresa Lluch (born 18 April 1970 in Barcelona, Catalonia) is a former field hockey goalkeeper from Spain. He won the silver medal with the men's national team at the 1996 Summer Olympics in Atlanta, Georgia. He also participated in the 1992 and 2000 Summer Olympics.

Notes

References

Spanish Olympic Committee

External links
 
 
 

1970 births
Living people
Spanish male field hockey players
Male field hockey goalkeepers
Olympic field hockey players of Spain
Field hockey players at the 1992 Summer Olympics
Field hockey players at the 1996 Summer Olympics
1998 Men's Hockey World Cup players
Field hockey players at the 2000 Summer Olympics
Field hockey players from Barcelona
Olympic medalists in field hockey
Medalists at the 1996 Summer Olympics
Olympic silver medalists for Spain
Club Egara players
1990 Men's Hockey World Cup players